Vitali Abramov may refer to:

Vitaliy Abramov (born 1974), Kazakhstani footballer
Vitalii Abramov (born 1998), Russian ice hockey player